The 1983–84 ACB season was the inaugural season of the ACB Primera División, the top Spanish professional basketball league. It started on 10 September 1983 with the first round of the regular season and ended on 13 April 1984 with the finals. The league was made up of the clubs that broke away from Spanish Basketball Federation at the end of the 1982–83 season with the aim to professionalize the league. The new league introduced the best-of-three playoffs at the end of the regular season just like in the Italian league.

Real Madrid won their first ACB title, and their 23rd Spanish title after the decision of the Competition Committee, when FC Barcelona didn't appear in the third game of the finals in protest of what it considered an unfair decision by this body following a fight between players in the second game of the finals: Davis was sanctioned for six games due to attack Real Madrid player Iturriaga, who had previously elbowed him in a block.

Format changes
For this season, the league was expanded to 16 teams and the teams were divided in two groups (Group Odd, Group Even) formed by the odd teams (1st, 3rd, 5th, 7th,...) and the even teams (2nd, 4th, 6th, 8th,...) of the final standings of the previous season. At the end of first phase, the top four teams of each group advanced to the Group A1 and the rest of the teams of each group advanced to the Group A2. At the end of second phase, the top four teams of the Group A1 advanced to the quarterfinals playoffs, the rest of the teams of the Group A1 and the top four teams of the Group A2 advanced to the first round playoffs, and the rest of the teams of the Group A2 advanced to the relegation playoffs of which three teams were relegated to Primera División B.

Another significant change was the introduction of the overtimes in case of draw.

Teams

Promotion and relegation (pre-season)
A total of 16 teams contested the league, including 12 sides from the 1982–83 Liga Nacional and four promoted from the 1982–83 Primera División B.

Teams promoted from Primera División B
Cajamadrid
Cafisa Canarias
Hospitalet ATO
Peñas Recreativas Huesca (achieved a vacant berth after the dissolution of Inmobanco)

Venues and locations

First phase

Group Odd

Group Even

Second phase

Group A1

Group A2

Playoffs

Championship playoffs

Source: Linguasport

Relegation playoffs

Source: Linguasport

Final standings

References

External links
 Official website 
 Linguasport 

 
Spanish
Liga ACB seasons